SYSTAT or Systat may refer to

 SYSTAT (software), a statistics and statistical graphics software package
 Systat Software, a software house, publisher of SYSTAT, SigmaScan, SigmaStat and SigmaPlot
 SYSTAT (DEC), a command on the DEC TOPS-10 and RSTS/E computer operating systems
 sysstat, a command-line tool that displays active processes and users
 systat (BSD), a BSD UNIX command-line tool to display system statistics in a full-screen view using ncurses/curses
 systat (protocol) (or Active Users), an Internet protocol